Eve Risser (born 1982) is a French jazz and improvised music performer, composer and arranger. She mostly plays piano and prepared piano, but also plays harpsichord and other instruments.

Life and career
Risser was born in 1982 in Colmar, France. She had piano lessons as a child and first saw graphic notation at the age of 11. This "set her imagination free. But those desires were quashed by her instructor, who situated that sort of interpretational freedom within a larger, rigorous practice of study."

Risser lived in Colmar until she was 18. She then studied in Strasbourg for four years, playing improvised music and jazz on the piano and contemporary music on the flute. She decided to concentrate on the piano after completing her studies. She reported that "When I stopped the flute, I felt so limited in my improvisations with timbres that I started to explore the inside of the piano to be able to imitate trumpets, percussions and saxophones [...] I realized that building stuff with my hands for the piano was super fun."

Risser was pianist in the Orchestre national de jazz from 2009 to 2013. The premiere of her White Desert, for a tentet with amateur choirs, was in March 2015.

Playing style
A reviewer described her playing on the 2012 trio album En Corps as being "anything but conventional, highly percussive, full of muted strings, extended techniques, and repetitive phrases". A Down Beat reviewer of her solo piano record Des Pas Sur La Neige commented on Risser's "arsenal of techniques and tools that transform her instrument into a kaleidoscopic sound machine, producing unexpected tones and timbres."

Discography
An asterisk (*) indicates that the year is that of release.

As leader/co-leader

As sidewoman

References

1982 births
French jazz pianists
21st-century French women pianists
Living people
People from Colmar